NA-128 Lahore-XII is a newly-created constituency for the National Assembly of Pakistan. It mainly comprises the Model Town Tehsil along with areas of Lahore Cantonment Tehsil, Walton Cantonment and Lahore City Tehsil.

Members of Parliament

2018-2022: NA-130 Lahore-VIII

Election 2018 
General elections were held on 25 July 2018.

By-election 2023 
A by-election will be held on 16 March 2023 due to the resignation of Shafqat Mahmood, the previous MNA from this seat.

See also
NA-127 Lahore-XI
NA-129 Lahore-XIII

References 

Lahore